Hovhannes Vahanian, 1832 in Constantinople, Ottoman Empire - 1891 in Constantinople) was an Ottoman politician, minister, social activist, writer, and reformer of Armenian descent. He was the brother of Srpouhi Dussap.

References 

Armenian-language writers
19th-century writers from the Ottoman Empire
Politicians of the Ottoman Empire
Armenians from the Ottoman Empire
Writers from Istanbul
1832 births
1891 deaths
19th-century male writers
Date of birth missing
Date of death missing